Jasiona may refer to the following places:
Jasiona, Brzeg County in Opole Voivodeship (south-west Poland)
Jasiona, Krapkowice County in Opole Voivodeship (south-west Poland)
Jasiona, Silesian Voivodeship (south Poland)
Jasiona, Prudnik County in Opole Voivodeship (south-west Poland)